The Maryland Terrapins women's lacrosse team represents the University of Maryland in National Collegiate Athletic Association (NCAA) Division I women's college lacrosse. The Maryland program has won 15 national championships, the most of any women's lacrosse program. The Terrapins have also made the most NCAA tournament appearances, won the most tournament games, and made the most NCAA championship game appearances. Before the NCAA sanctioned women's lacrosse, Maryland also won the AIAW national championship in 1981.

Starting with the 2014–2015 season, the Terrapins joined the Big Ten women's lacrosse league.

Historical statistics
*Statistics through 2019 season

Individual career records
Reference:

Individual single-season records
Reference:

Seasons

Postseason results

The Terrapins have appeared in 36 NCAA tournaments. Their postseason record is 73–22.

See also
Jen Adams

References

 
1974 establishments in Maryland
Lacrosse clubs established in 1974